The 2021 Rafa Nadal Open was a professional tennis tournament played on hard courts. It was the third edition of the tournament which was part of the 2021 ATP Challenger Tour. It took place in Manacor, Spain between 30 August and 5 September 2021.

Singles main-draw entrants

Seeds

 1 Rankings are as of 23 August 2021.

Other entrants
The following players received wildcards into the singles main draw:
  Nicolás Álvarez Varona
  Carlos Gómez-Herrera
  Daniel Rincón

The following players received entry into the singles main draw as alternates:
  Evgeny Karlovskiy
  Stefan Kozlov
  Nicolás Mejía
  Hiroki Moriya
  Roberto Ortega Olmedo
  Roberto Quiroz

The following players received entry from the qualifying draw:
  Nick Chappell
  Michael Geerts
  Alejandro González
  Johannes Härteis

The following players received entry as lucky losers:
  Nicolas Moreno de Alboran
  Jan Zieliński

Champions

Singles

  Lukáš Lacko def.  Yasutaka Uchiyama 5–7, 7–6(10–8), 6–1.

Doubles

  Karol Drzewiecki /  Sergio Martos Gornés def.  Fernando Romboli /  Jan Zieliński 6–4, 4–6, [10–3].

References

2021 ATP Challenger Tour
2021 in Spanish sport
August 2021 sports events in Spain
September 2021 sports events in Spain